The Coalition of Patriots for Change (Coalition des patriotes pour le changement) (CPC) is a coalition of major rebel groups in the Central African Republic created in 2020 to disrupt the 2020–21 Central African general election.

Background 
On 3 December 2020, the Constitutional Court of the Central African Republic rejected the candidature of former president François Bozizé in the upcoming presidential elections. On 4 December, François Bozizé met with Mahamat al-Khatim, leader of the Central African Patriotic Movement (MPC), in Kaga-Bandoro before leaving for his stronghold, Bossangoa.

History 

On 15 December 2020, major rebel groups in the Central African Republic including Anti-balaka, UPC, FPRC, 3R and MPC created a coalition. Since then, the group seized many towns including Yaloke and Bossembele. Bambari was temporarily seized by rebels. On 25 December, rebels killed three peacekeepers in Dekoa and Bakouma. Due to rebel attacks, elections did not take place in many areas of the country. Some 800 of the country's polling stations, 14% of the total, were closed due to violence, and during the first round, voting was unable to take place in 29 of the 71 sub-prefectures, while six others only managed to partially vote before being shut down due to voter intimidation. On 15 January, rebels attacked Bangui killing one peacekeeper before being repelled by international forces. On 21 March, the coalition announced that Bozizé had become the group's "general coordinator". On 6 April UPC reportedly left Coalition of Patriots for Change, but officially rejoined in early December 2021.

References 

Factions of the Central African Republic Civil War
Rebel groups in the Central African Republic
Rebel groups that actively control territory